Acronicta afflicta, the afflicted dagger moth, is a moth of the family Noctuidae. It is found in Canada (Nova Scotia, Quebec and Ontario), the United States (including Alabama, North Carolina, Oklahoma, Georgia, Maryland, New York and Ohio) as well as northern Mexico.

The wingspan is about 36 mm. Adults are on wing from May to September depending on the location.

The larvae feed on various Quercus species.

External links
Lepidoptera of Wayne County, Ohio

Acronicta
Moths of North America
Moths described in 1864